Jack Harrison (18 December 1912 – 4 June 2010) was a Scottish educator, military pilot, and prisoner of war during World War II.  Harrison was one of the last known survivors of the Stalag Luft III Great Escape. Stalag Luft III was a Luftwaffe run prisoner of war camp in Silesia (modern-day Poland).

World War II

The Great Escape
Harrison was a prisoner at Stalag Luft III during World War II. As an RAF pilot he took part in the planning of "The Great Escape" from Stalag Luft III. Harrison never made it out of the camp because the escape attempt was discovered before he could get in the tunnel. There were 76 prisoners who made the escape in March 1944. Most were recaptured and 50 were executed.

Personal
Harrison was born on 18 December 1912. On the eve of World War II, Harrison was a Latin teacher at Dornoch Academy in Sutherland. He enlisted in the Royal Air Force as a pilot once war with Nazi Germany broke out.

References

1912 births
2010 deaths
Participants in the Great Escape from Stalag Luft III
Royal Air Force officers
Royal Air Force personnel of World War II
World War II prisoners of war held by Germany
Scottish schoolteachers
British World War II prisoners of war